The second season of Asia's Got Talent (AGT) premiered on October 12, 2017 at 8:30 pm (UTC+8) across 27 countries in Asia. The winning act received a grand prize of US$100,000.

The show was hosted by Alan Wong and Justin Bratton, replacing Marc Nelson and Rovilson Fernandez from the prior season. David Foster and Anggun returned as judges, while Melanie C and Vanness Wu were replaced by Jay Park.

The official sponsor for the season was Traveloka while Indonesian magician The Sacred Riana was the season winner.

 Auditions 

 Open auditions 
The open auditions for the second season took place in key cities in Asia. Open auditions were held in Singapore, Malaysia, Philippines, Taiwan, Thailand, and Indonesia. The open auditions were judged by Asia's Got Talent producers. Auditionees were also allowed to submit their audition videos online via the show's official website. Those who passed will proceed to the live judges' auditions.

 Judges' auditions 
The judges' auditions were taped from July 28, 2017 at the Pinewood Iskandar Malaysia Studios in Johor, Malaysia like the first season.

This is the first season of the show to have three judges instead of four. This is also the first season where the hosts (as one) get an opportunity to press the golden buzzer.

The judges' auditions once again feature the Golden Buzzer. Each judge would have one chance to use the Golden Buzzer. New for this season, apart from the judges, the hosts (as one) get an opportunity to press the golden buzzer. The so-called Golden Acts, those on whom the Golden Buzzer is used, would automatically advance to the semifinals. Jay Park pressed his golden buzzer for Kyrgyz contortionist dance group, ADEM Dance Crew on the premiere episode. It was followed by Anggun who pressed the buzzer on the second episode for the Japanese comedic magician, Akira Kimura. Alan Wong and Justin Bratton would then use the golden buzzer together on Mongolian digital dancer, Canion Shijirbat. Finally, David Foster used the last golden buzzer on Taiwanese electric ukuleleist, Feng E.

Below are the acts who are confirmed within the show to have received at least two Yes votes and thus had successfully passed their auditions, as well as the Golden Acts. The list does not cover everyone who had passed. Due to time constraints, some acts, named or otherwise, are seen with their fates partially known (only one known Yes vote) or edited out completely from broadcast and are thus not listed.

Semifinals
The deliberation round was also held at the Pinewood Iskandar Malaysia Studios in Johor, Malaysia, as opposed to the previous season where it was held at the Marina Bay Sands. It was shown at end of the final auditions episode on November 9, 2017. During the entire auditions, 99 acts received at least 2 yeses from the judges. The judges then chose the 20 remaining acts who would compete in semi-finals. The four Golden Acts and the judges' picks would bring the total number of semifinalists to 24. The first eight semifinalists was announced after the deliberation round, with the others to be revealed gradually as the semifinal rounds progress.

The semifinal rounds were also taped at the same studio as the judges' auditions. In the previous season, it was held at the Marina Bay Sands.

For the first time in Got Talent franchise history, this season makes use of completely online voting methods. The audience may vote through hashtags on Facebook, Messenger, and Google search. A maximum of 10 votes per method per day is implemented.

Facebook
 Each act is assigned an official unique voting hashtag during the semifinal. The viewer must create Facebook post with the hashtag of the act. Comments on third party Facebook pages are also counted. A post or comment with more than one official hashtag (whether the same or different) renders the vote invalid.

Messenger
 The viewer must search for Asia's Got Talent on Facebook Messenger. A photo carousel will appear with the pictures of the week's semifinalists. Click the picture to vote.

Google Search
 The user must have a Google account first. The phrase "Asia's Got Talent vote" must be typed on the search box. The photos of the week's acts will appear. Click the photo to choose the act. The slider on the right assigns 1 to 10 votes for that act.

This season of Asia's Got Talent uses a completely online voting, as compared to other Got Talent franchises where SMS votes are available. The revelation of results is slightly different, being revealed in the following week rather than the next night (as semifinal rounds are only once weekly, barring replays). The Golden Buzzer last season was replaced by the Judges' Pick, although its mechanics is the same where the judges would come to a unanimous decision to send one act straight to the finals. This is similar to the Judges' Choice in the other local franchises, albeit one ahead of the vote rather than after and based on the vote. Aside from the Judges' Pick, the two acts with the most public votes would also advance to the finals. There would thus be a total of nine finalists emerging from the three semifinal rounds.

Ages listed are as of the time of the auditions. In the case of group acts, the age ranges only accounted for the members present at the auditions. The age(s) of any additional member(s) who only appeared in the semifinal may or may not be within the range designated.

Notes

Semifinals summary

Semifinals 1 (November 16) 

Semifinals 2 (November 23) 

Semifinals 3 (November 30) 

Note

Finals
The finals, like the previous season, were held at the Marina Bay Sands, Singapore, over a span of two episodes, a performance night and a results night.

On the results night, David Foster, on piano, played "Love Theme from St. Elmo's Fire", a song from the St. Elmo's Fire film. Anggun sang "What We Remember", a single from her latest album "8". Lastly, Jay Park, together with Yultron, debuted their newest song "Forget About Tomorrow".

 Contestants who appeared on previous shows or seasons 
 ADEM Dance Crew was a finalist on the sixth season of Česko Slovensko Má Talent. They also received a golden buzzer during the auditions.
 Akira Kimura, who himself has been living in Indonesia for two and a half years prior to auditioning for the show, previously appeared in an Indonesian talent search show Go Show in which he managed to reach the semifinals.
 Canion Shijirbat appeared in the second season of Mongolia's Got Talent, where he placed second. He also competed in the twelfth season of America's Got Talent, only to be eliminated during the Judge Cuts. His audition in this season occurred a few months after his Judge Cuts performance and a few weeks after said performance was aired in the United States.
 Power Storm was a finalist on the third season of Thailand's Got Talent. Three years later, they finished as a semifinalist on the sixth season of the same show.
 Deniel Sarmiento was a semifinalist on the fifth season of Pilipinas Got Talent.
 D' Intensity Breakers placed fifth on the fourth season of the local Got Talent franchise of the Philippines, Pilipinas Got Talent. Afterwards, they appeared on the first season of Asia's Got Talent, getting four yeses but weren't chosen by the judges to advance to the semifinals.
 Deenormous took part in the previous season where he received 4 buzzers and 4 nos.
 Neil Rey Garcia Llanes was a contestant in the previous season. He got 4 yeses and was chosen by the judges to advance to the semifinals but he has withdrawn from the competition and let go his semi final spot to finish his studies.
 DM-X Comvaleñoz was a semifinalist on the fifth season of Pilipinas Got Talent.
 Mercifuletes Viola, D'Gemini, and Urban Crew joined the fifth season of Pilipinas Got Talent.
 Garrett Bolden Jr. also joined Pilipinas Got Talent and became semifinalist.
 Fitri Cerado also auditioned on the first season of the show.
 Jayvee and Bjorn Mendoza, as a duo, joined the Philippine franchise of La Banda, Pinoy Boyband Superstar. They were eliminated in the Performance Night of the Middle Rounds.
 Yumbo Dump appeared in several variety shows in their home country, starting with the show "Pu"-sama 100%ALL NATURAL KUSANAGI&YUSUKE in 2011. They also appeared in the Tamil film Jilla.
 Little K-Tigers performed on Mnet's Hit The Stage, a South Korean dance survival contest.
 Louis Choi appeared on the fourth season of the Korean game show I Can See Your Voice.
 The Juans, who appeared on Episode 4, is a Filipino boy band whose cover of Balisong, originally sang by Rivermaya, was used as the soundtrack of the hit Filipino film 100 Tula Para Kay Stella.
 Angel Tornado was a finalist on the sixth season of Thailand's Got Talent.
 Meowfie is an internet meowing sensation. He also have appeared on several films and tv shows.
 Krittaya Ariyasit also appeared on the sixth season of Thailand's Got Talent and reached the semifinals.
 The Sacred Riana was a finalist on Indonesian magician talent search show, The Next Mentalist, where she became a runner-up.
 Jane Callista joined the first season of The Voice Kids Indonesia but eliminated on Live Shows round 1.
 Viriya Rici appeared on the third season of Indonesia Mencari Bakat, an Indonesian talent search show similar to the Got Talent franchise of Indonesia, Indonesia's Got Talent, and reached the semifinals.
 Angela July joined the second season of X Factor Indonesia and finished seventh.
 Noah Velasco is a part of The Velasco Brothers, a semifinalist in the previous season.
 Bikoon! has appeared in many TV shows in Japan since 2001, one of them being the variety show All That's Manzai. Shiro Maeda, the shorter of the duo hidden inside the black bag at the start of the duo's audition, appeared separately in two other variety shows, Lincoln and Ima-chan no "Jitsu wa...".
 Quinn Calista Masongsong competed in Tawag ng Tanghalan Kids, a singing competition within the variety show, It's Showtime. There, she was a one-day champion, losing her title the next day.

References

External links 
 Asia's Got Talent official website

2010s Singaporean television series
Got Talent
2017 Singaporean television seasons